The 2016 Citrus Bowl (December) was an American college football bowl game played on December 31, 2016 at the Camping World Stadium in Orlando, Florida. The 71st edition of the Citrus Bowl, it was one of the 2016–17 NCAA football bowl games concluding the 2016 NCAA Division I FBS football season.  The game was nationally televised by ABC.  It was sponsored by the Buffalo Wild Wings restaurant franchise and was officially titled the Buffalo Wild Wings Citrus Bowl.

Teams
Teams were selected from the SEC and the ACC.  The matchup was  announced on December 4, 2016. LSU was chosen from the SEC and Louisville was chosen from the ACC.

LSU Tigers

Louisville Cardinals

Game summary

Scoring summary

Statistics

References

Citrus Bowl
Citrus Bowl (game)
Louisville Cardinals football bowl games
LSU Tigers football bowl games
2010s in Orlando, Florida
Citrus Bowl
Citrus Bowl